Lindsay Davenport defeated Vera Zvonareva 6–3, 6–2 in the final to win the women's singles tennis title at the 2004 Cincinnati Open. It was her 6th title of the year and the 44th of her career.

This event was not held from 1989 onwards, so no defending champion was declared. Barbara Potter was the last champion in the 1988 edition.

Seeds
The first two seeds received a bye into the second round.

Draw

Finals

Top half

Bottom half

External links
 Main and Qualifying Draws

2004 Western & Southern Financial Group Masters